Jan Pieter van Suchtelen, Count of Liikkala, Pyotr Kornilovich Suhtelen (2 August 1751, Grave – 6 January 1836, Stockholm), was born in the Netherlands, and was a general in the Russian army during the Russo-Swedish War (1808–1809). In 1812 Suchtelen was the plenipotentiary for Russian Emperor Alexander I in Örebro where he negotiated and signed the Treaty of Örebro which brought to an end the Anglo–Russian War (1807–1812). In that treaty his titles included "general of engineers, quarter-master general, [and] member of the council of state".

He was active as military engineer. He established a preliminary project of the Modlin fortress, near Warsaw, when Russia captured this area after the third partition of Poland.  

Since 1783 he actively worked in Russia. For his project of Staro-Kalinkin Bridge in St Petersburg he was promoted to the rank of colonel. 

Created count, enrolled to the nobility of Finland where his main estate was located. 

Charlotte Disbrowe visited Sweden in 1834, where her father, (Sir Edward Cromwell Disbrowe, a senior diplomat with the British Foreign Office) was stationed. She met Van Suchtelen and mentioned in her biography that:

Notes

References
Disbrowe, Charlotte Anne Albinia.  Old days in diplomacy: recollections of a closed century, Edition: 2, Jarrold, 1903, Chapter IV In Sweden.
Frilund, Göran. The Union's Last War: The Russian-Swedish War of 1808-09, The Napoleon Series, Retrieved 2009-02-23. Cites Hornborg, Eirik. När riket sprängdes - fälttågen i Finland och Västerbotten 1808-1809, Holger Schildts förlag, Helsingfors; 1955.
Hansard, Thomas Curson. The Parliamentary Debates from the Year 1803 to the Present Time Volume 24, Great Britain Parliament, and Hansard, 1813
Staff. Annual Bibliography of the History of the Printed Book and Libraries: Volume 29 By Department Of Special Collections Of The Koninklijke Bibliotheek The Hague Staff ..., Edition: illustrated, Published by Springer, 2002, 
Otto S. Lankhorst Jan Pieter van Suchtelen (1751-1836) verzamelaar van boeken en handschriften (in Dutch)

1751 births
1836 deaths
People from Grave, North Brabant
Diplomats of the Russian Empire
Russian people of Dutch descent
Russian people of the Kościuszko Uprising
Barons of the Russian Empire